LIC Building, Visakhapatnam is an 11-storied commercial building in Visakhapatnam, India. It is located on the Jeevitha Bima Road, opposite to the City Central Park. It was one of the tallest buildings in the city.

About
The LIC Building was one of the first tall structures in Visakhapatnam in the 1970s. At that time, it resembled a light house which was visible from the four corners of the city. Back then, it was a wonder of the city. Many central government offices are located near this building.

See also

 List of tallest buildings in Visakhapatnam

References

Buildings and structures in Visakhapatnam
Uttarandhra
Life Insurance Corporation